The 2014 Connecticut Open (formerly known as the New Haven Open at Yale) was a women's tennis tournament played on outdoor hard courts. It was the 46th edition of the Connecticut Open, and part of the Premier Series of the 2014 WTA Tour. It took place at the Cullman-Heyman Tennis Center in New Haven, Connecticut, United States, from August 15 through August 23. It was the last event on the 2014 US Open Series before the 2014 US Open.

Singles main-draw entrants

Seeds

 Rankings are as of August 11, 2014

Other entrants
The following players received wildcards into the singles main draw:
  Dominika Cibulková
  Kirsten Flipkens
  Andrea Petkovic
  Samantha Stosur

The following players received entry from the qualifying draw:
  Timea Bacsinszky
  Irina-Camelia Begu
  Belinda Bencic
  Misaki Doi
  Peng Shuai
  Sílvia Soler Espinosa

The following player received entry as a lucky loser:
  Caroline Garcia

Withdrawals
Before the tournament
  Carla Suárez Navarro --> replaced by Caroline Garcia
  Zhang Shuai --> replaced by Alison Riske

Doubles main-draw entrants

Seeds

Rankings are as of August 11, 2014

Other entrants
The following pair received a wildcard into the doubles main draw:
  Nicole Gibbs /  Grace Min

The following pair received entry as alternates:
  Alison Riske /  CoCo Vandeweghe

Withdrawals
Before the tournament
  Kristina Mladenovic (lumbar spine injury)

Finals

Singles

 Petra Kvitová defeated  Magdaléna Rybáriková, 6–4, 6–2

Doubles

 Andreja Klepač /  Sílvia Soler Espinosa defeated  Marina Erakovic /  Arantxa Parra Santonja, 7–5, 4–6, [10–7]

References

External links
Official website

 
Connecticut Open by year
2014 WTA Tour
August 2014 sports events in the United States